James F. "Jim" Crowley was an American athlete, distance runner, and a member of the Irish American Athletic Club. In 1910, he was known as "King of the Marathoners" for having competed in and won more marathons than any of the athletes of his day.

In 1908, Crowley won the second oldest marathon in the U.S., the Yonkers Marathon, held on Thanksgiving Day, sponsored by the Mercury Athletic Club of Yonkers, New York,  "winning from a large and classy field in the excellent time of 2 hours 49 minutes 16.4 seconds." "Before a crowd of nearly twenty thousand uproarious enthusiasts ... James F. Crowley of the Irish American Athletic Club, crossed the tape, a winner of the biggest and probably the most spectacular event of its kind ever held in America."

On December 26, 1908, he finished second to Matthew Maloney in the marathon from Rye to Columbus Circle, New York." Crowley again finished second to Maloney in an indoor marathon before 5,000 "wildly cheering" spectators held within the second Madison Square Garden on January 8, 1909 (3:00:26). Maloney was reported to have set a new indoor record for the event in a time of 2:54:45.4.

Approximately 110,000 spectators were reported to have turned out to see 180 runners compete in the New Jersey Athletic Club Marathon on May 15, 1909. With "scorching heat" noted to have affected many of the athletes, Crowley recorded a time of 3:07:16 and "won by a mile" over Harry Jensen of the Pastime Athletic Club.

On September 6, 1909, The New York Times reported "nearly every athlete of note in the Metropolitan Association of the Amateur Athletic Association" competed in the Irish American Athletic Club's Tailtin Games before 7,000 spectators at Celtic Park. Crowley won the two-mile steeplechase in a time of 11:12.

In 1909, Crowley held the following A.A.U indoor records:
 16-Mile Run - 1:39:07
 17-Mile Run - 1:46:07
 20-Mile Run - 2:07:11
 21-Mile Run - 2:14:35
 Indoor Marathon - 2:38:48

Notes

External links
Irish America Archives - NYU
Winged Fist Organization

Year of birth missing
Year of death missing
American male long-distance runners
American people of Irish descent
World record setters in athletics (track and field)
American male steeplechase runners